David Barrett Reece (born September 13, 1948 in Troy, New York) is a retired American professional ice hockey goaltender who played the 1975–76 season with the Boston Bruins. He posted an NHL record of seven wins, five losses and two ties, with two shutouts and a 3.32 goals against average.

Playing career
Reece is known best for surrendering eleven goals against the Toronto Maple Leafs on February 7, 1976, which included six goals and four assists for Darryl Sittler, setting an NHL-record ten points in one game. He was in net as a replacement for starters Gerry Cheevers and Gilles Gilbert. Reece played the whole game and was never pulled by coach Don Cherry. The game was Reece's last NHL appearance.

In international hockey, Reece served as Mike Curran's backup at the 1977 Ice Hockey World Championship tournament in Vienna. He also was a member of the preliminary U.S. Olympic roster for the 1972 Winter Olympics but did not make the final cut.

A four-year collegiate hockey player on the University of Vermont men's hockey team, Reece is 7th all-time in save percentage (.900) and goals against average (3.01), while also ranking 5th in all-time saves. He has been named a member of the Vermont Hockey All-Time Team. During his time at UVM, Reece double majored in political science and education.

Post-playing career
Reece was also a player agent for Western Professional Hockey League enforcer and track star David Watson and many other minor league players.

Reece went on to live in Wilder, Vermont, for a number of years, working as a skating instructor and educational consultant, and later lived in Greenville, South Carolina.

Career statistics

Regular season and playoffs

International

External links
 

1948 births
Living people
American men's ice hockey goaltenders
Boston Braves (AHL) players
Boston Bruins players
Ice hockey players from New York (state)
Rhode Island Reds players
Rochester Americans players
Sportspeople from Troy, New York
Springfield Indians players
Undrafted National Hockey League players
Vermont Catamounts men's ice hockey players